Koiak 28 - Coptic Calendar - Koiak 30 

The twenty-ninth day of the Coptic month of Koiak, the fourth month of the Coptic year. On a common year, this day corresponds to December 25, of the Julian Calendar, and January 7, of the Gregorian Calendar. This day falls in the Coptic season of Peret, the season of emergence. On this day, the Coptic Church celebrates the Feast of the Nativity.

Commemorations

Feasts 

 The Feast of the Nativity of Jesus Christ

Saints 

 The martyrdom of the Martyrs of Akhmeem

References 

Days of the Coptic calendar